Elkhorn Creek is a  tributary of the Tug Fork, belonging to the Ohio River and Mississippi River watersheds. It is located in McDowell and Mercer counties in the U.S. state of West Virginia. Elkhorn Creek is also known as Elkhorn Fork and Elkhorn River.

According to tradition, Elkhorn Creek was named after an incident when a pioneer hunter displayed an elk's horn near the creek's mouth.

Tributaries 
Tributary streams are listed from source to mouth.

Angle Hollow
Turkey Gap Branch
Johns Knob Branch
Lick Branch
Trace Branch
North Fork Elkhorn Creek
Bearwallow Branch
Buzzard Branch
Burk Creek
Clark Branch
Coalbank Branch
Big Branch
Bottom Creek
Rockhouse Branch
Laurel Branch
Upper Belcher Branch
Lick Branch
Meetinghouse Branch
Mill Creek

List of cities and towns along Elkhorn Creek 
Big Four
Bottom Creek
Eckman
Elkhorn
Ennis
Keystone
Kimball
Kyle
Landgraff
Maitland
Maybeury
Northfork
Powhatan
Superior
Switchback
Upland
Vivian
Welch

See also 
 List of West Virginia rivers

References

Rivers of West Virginia
Rivers of McDowell County, West Virginia
Rivers of Mercer County, West Virginia